Vidno is a village in Kavarna Municipality, Dobrich Province, northeastern Bulgaria.

References

Villages in Dobrich Province